The Whistle-Blower is a two-part British television drama series, created and written by playwright Patrick Harbinson, first broadcast on BBC1 on 14 April 2001. Billed as the BBC's "Big Easter Drama", the series, which stars Amanda Burton and Bill Patterson, follows Laura Tracey (Burton), a bank employee who places herself and her family in mortal danger after reporting irregularities in her firm's overseas accounts to the National Criminal Intelligence Service. When Laura learns that the transactions relate to a number of South American drug cartels, she and her family are immediately taken into the Witness Protection Programme and relocated.

The series broadcast over two consecutive nights, with the concluding episode following on 15 April 2001. The first episode drew 8.02 million viewers, while the second attracted 7.8 million. The series was released on Region 2 DVD in (Germany) and the Netherlands on 19 June 2012, however both titles are now out of print.

Reception
Mark Lawson of The Guardian said of the series; "There's a double irony in the fact that the theme of The Whistleblower is deep disguise. The first is that, in its plot essentials, the two-part drama sometimes feels as if it used to be called something else. Specifically, you feel that the idea was born as The Insider, the classy American movie in which Russell Crowe ratted on the tobacco business."

Cast

 Amanda Burton as Laura Tracey
 Bill Paterson as DI Neil Sleighthorne
 Neil Pearson as Dominic Tracey
 Penelope Wilton as Heather Graham
 Emma Cunniffe as Kathy Enfield
 Virginia McKenna as Theresa Elliot
 Richard Johnson as Sir Alastair Montgomery
 Indira Varma as Diane Crossman
 Pip Torrens as Philip Amis
 Ashley Walters as Keith Lindo
 Adam Kotz as Roger Beale
 Colin McFarlane as Bobby De Luca
 Charlotte Salt as Sasha Tracey
 Zach Grenier as Louis T. Weitzman
 Liam Hess as Daniel Tracey
 Martin Ledwith as Vincent Shearer
 Madeleine Potter as Caroline Dupress
 Claire Price as Emily Shearer
 Colin Prockter as Pater Carey
 Christopher Robbie as Judge Eglee
 Vincent Rubio as Tomas Negrete
 Angus Wright as Damien Sutton

Episodes

References

External links

2001 British television series debuts
2001 British television series endings
2000s British crime drama television series
British crime drama television series
English-language television shows
BBC television dramas